Das Kunstblatt was a German art magazine published between 1917 and 1933 by Paul Westheim in Weimar Germany.

References

Bibliography
Malcolm Gee, ″The 'cultured city': the art press in Berlin and Paris in the early twentieth century″, in Printed Matters: Printing, Publishing and Urban Culture in Europe in the modern period, eds. M. Gee and T. Kirk, Ashgate, 2002, 150–173.
 Malcolm Gee, ‘The Berlin Art World, 1918-1933’ in: Malcolm Gee, Tim Kirk and Jill Steward (eds), The City in central Europe : culture and society from 1800 to the present: Ashgate, 1999.

External links
 WorldCat record

1917 establishments in Germany
1933 disestablishments in Germany
Defunct magazines published in Germany
Visual arts magazines published in Germany
German-language magazines
Magazines established in 1917
Magazines disestablished in 1933
Weimar culture